James Parsons (born 12 April 1997) is a former professional Australian rules footballer who currently plays for Box Hill Hawks team in the VFL. He previously played for the Geelong Football Club in the Australian Football League (AFL).

AFL career

He was drafted by Geelong with their second selection and twenty-seventh overall in the 2016 rookie draft. He made his debut in the twenty-nine point win against  at Etihad Stadium in round three of the 2017 season.

Post AFL

Parsons was delisted at the end of the 2020 season. He signed for the Carlton reserves in 2021.
In 2022 he lined up with the Box Hill Hawks.

Family history
Parsons's grandfather Peter Marshall played for Victorian Football League (VFL) club Collingwood during the 1960s.

References

External links

 

1997 births
Living people
Geelong Football Club players
Box Hill Football Club players
Eastern Ranges players
Australian rules footballers from Victoria (Australia)